Garlic butter, also known as beurre à la bourguignonne, is a compound butter used as a flavoring for many dishes or as a condiment. It is composed of butter and garlic mixed into a paste. The ingredients are blended and typically chilled before use.

Dipping sauce 
In the United States, garlic butter in small cups is sometimes served with  seafood (such as lobster), pizza, or breadsticks as a dip. To prolong shelf life, the dip may use clarified butter or flavored oils.

See also
 List of butter dishes
 List of condiments

References

Butter
Garlic dishes
French sauces
Foods featuring butter